Papinville Marais des Cygnes River Bridge, is a historic Pinned Pratt through truss located at Papinville, Bates County, Missouri. It was built in 1884 by the Kansas City Bridge and Iron Co. and spans the Marais des Cygnes River. It is a three span bridge with a central Pratt truss measuring 116 feet and two connected Warren-pony truss spans. It rests on stone abutments with concrete and steel piers and measures a total 234 feet long.

It was listed on the National Register of Historic Places in 2002.

References

Road bridges on the National Register of Historic Places in Missouri
Bridges completed in 1884
Buildings and structures in Bates County, Missouri
National Register of Historic Places in Bates County, Missouri
Pratt truss bridges in the United States
Metal bridges in the United States
Warren truss bridges in the United States